Megan Donner is a fictional character and one of two original protagonists of the CBS crime drama CSI: Miami. Portrayed by Kim Delaney, Donner appeared in the first ten episodes of the series. Megan was an MDPD Lieutenant and the Day Shift Assistant Supervisor of the Miami Dade Crime Lab. Prior to the series she was the Director of CSI.

Casting 
Following the back-door pilot, Zuiker stated that he believed the series "needed a little more balance in terms of a leading woman". Executives offered Sela Ward the part of Megan Donner, a Lieutenant and Horatio's former boss. Ward turned down the role, and producers later cast Kim Delaney. Ann Donahue described Delaney's casting as "a no-brainer", stating that "when Kim became available, we knew in a heartbeat that we wanted her." Zuiker elaborated, noting that "Kim brings a level of maturity, a level of balance with David Caruso [...] We just felt we were missing something in the whole picture - we needed a strong female in the cast." The New York Times reported that original lead Emily Procter would "now follow Ms. Delaney in the credits."

Departure 
In late 2002, despite receiving excellent feedback from producers, Delaney departed the cast after ten episodes. CBS issued a statement noting that Delaney's character had become less integral to the series as it progressed, "they had hoped to duplicate the sparks between William Petersen and Marg Helgenberger on the original CSI," noted EW, but Delaney and Caruso's chemistry was lackluster. Delaney became the first of many cast members to depart the series, and was not replaced.

On the show

Background 
In 1997, Megan was a Detective working alongside Caine on the Miami Police Department's Homicide Squad. When the Crime Lab was set up in order to assist the police department, she was granted the directorship, whilst Caine was made a supervisor. Both achieved the rank of Lieutenant shortly thereafter. In early 2002, Megan's husband, fellow Detective Sean Donner, attempted to talk a suicidal man from the ledge of a building, but was pulled over with him instead. Sean died in the line of duty, and as a result Megan took a six-month leave of absence. When she returned, Caine had been made Director of the Crime Lab as well as day shift supervisor, and Megan was immediately demoted to his number two.

Storylines 
When Megan first returned to the crime lab, colleague and friend Tim Speedle gave her some sympathy. Megan seemed insulted by this, quickly pulling away from Tim when he patted her on the shoulder. Megan had a friendly relationship with then coroner Alexx Woods. She and Alexx were chatty in autopsy, and clearly got on with each other. Her relationship with Eric Delko was rocky. At one point, Eric stated, "Who does she think she is? She can't just walk back into the lab and take over," to which Tim Speedle replied, "You're an ass, you know that?" Her friendships with Calleigh Duquesne and Horatio Caine were strictly working relationships, with no friendly warmth involved.

Succession

References

American female characters in television
CSI: Miami characters
Fictional female scientists
Fictional forensic scientists
Fictional Miami-Dade Police Department detectives
Television characters introduced in 2002